The discography of Grégory Lemarchal, a French pop rock singer, comprises two studio albums, two live albums, one compilation album, and nine singles. After winning the fourth season of Star Academy France in 2004, Lemarchal released his debut studio album, Je deviens moi (2005) on Mercury Records, which peaked at number one in France. In 2006 Lemarchal released Olympia 06, which was recorded live at the Olympia music hall in Paris. In 2007, following Lemarchal's death due to cystic fibrosis, two albums were released posthumously, his second studio album La Voix d'un ange, and his second live album, Les Pas d'un ange. The single "De temps en temps" reached number one on the Syndicat National de l'Édition Phonographique chart in France following Lemarchal's death. The year 2009 saw the release of the compilation album Rêves, comprising all singles released by Lemarchal, including additional tracks.

Albums

Singles

Other charted songs

Notes
A^ This position came from the French compilation chart.
B^ These positions come from the Ultratip chart.

References

Discographies of French artists
Pop music discographies